Petar Milas (born 28 August 1995) is a Croatian professional boxer who has held the WBC Mediterranean heavyweight title since 2018.

Professional career
Milas made his professional debut on 8 December 2015, scoring a first-round technical knockout (TKO) over Marin Zulum at the Joker Gym in Split, Croatia.

After compiling a record of 10–0 (8 KOs) he faced former world title challenger, Kevin Johnson, for the IBO International heavyweight title on 10 March 2018 at the Maritim Berghotel in Braunlage, Germany. Milas became the second person to stop Johnson in 41 fights, capturing the IBO International title by eighth-round TKO after the referee called a halt to the contest on the advice of the ringside doctor due to a cut above Johnson's left eye. After retaining the title via unanimous decision (UD) against former world title challenger Francesco Pianeta in June, he defeated Mirko Tintor on 6 October at the TuS Halle in Traunreut, Germany, capturing the vacant WBC Mediterranean heavyweight title via fourth-round knockout (KO).

Professional boxing record

References

Living people
1995 births
Croatian male boxers
Sportspeople from Split, Croatia
Heavyweight boxers
Bridgerweight boxers